Sunj or Sunaj or Sevenj may refer to:
 Sevenj, Fars
 Sunj, Baneh, Kurdistan Province
 Sunj-e Olya, Baneh County, Kurdistan Province
 Sunaj, Saqqez, Kurdistan Province